Nancy Southern  is a Canadian businesswoman and the CEO of ATCO, a publicly traded company based in Calgary, Alberta, Canada. Her father Ron Southern was the founder of ATCO and the Spruce Meadows equestrian centre.

Early life and education 
Southern was born and raised in Calgary, Alberta, and educated at the University of Calgary where she received a degree in economics.

Career 
Southern joined the ATCO Board of Directors in 1989 and named President & CEO of ATCO in 2003.

Personal life
Southern is an accomplished equestrian show jumper and her family owns Spruce Meadows, an equestrian show jumping complex. She is married to Jonathan Asselin, an olympian that competed at the 2000 Summer Olympics.

References

Living people
Canadian chief executives
Canadian women business executives
Year of birth missing (living people)